Taylor Henderson (born 1993) is an Australian singer.

Taylor Henderson may also refer to:

Taylor Henderson (album), a 2013 album by the singer
 Taylor Henderson, violinist for Australian band Operator Please